Minnesota State Highway 97 (MN 97) is a  highway in Minnesota, which runs from its junction with Interstate 35 and Anoka County Road 23 in Columbus, near Forest Lake, and continues east to its eastern terminus at its intersection with State Highway 95 in Scandia, near Marine on St. Croix. MN 97 is also known as Scandia Trail.

Route description

State Highway 97 serves as an east–west arterial route between the communities of Columbus, Forest Lake, and Scandia.

Highway 97 intersects U.S. Highway 61 in Forest Lake.

The route is legally defined as Legislative Route 97 in the Minnesota Statutes, except for the short portion between I-35 and U.S. 61, which is part of unmarked Minnesota Constitutional Route 62.

History
State Highway 97 was authorized in 1933 between State Highway 95 in Scandia and U.S. Highway 61 in Forest Lake.

The route was completely paved by 1941.

Highway 97 was extended west of U.S. 61 in the mid 1960s to connect with Interstate 35.  This expanded section was originally part of U.S. Highway 8.

Major intersections

References

097
Transportation in Anoka County, Minnesota
Transportation in Washington County, Minnesota